Calcium ferrocyanide is an inorganic compound with the formula Ca2[Fe(CN)6]. It is the Ca2+ salt of [Fe(CN)6]4-, ferrocyanide complex ion.  A yellow solid, it is used as a precursor to the pigment Prussian blue.

Safety
It was listed in 2012 by the EU as a "Food Improvement Agent". 

In the EU, ferrocyanides (E 535–538) were, as of 2018, solely authorised in two food categories as salt substitutes. Kidneys are the organ for ferrocyanide toxicity.

References

E-number additives
Nephrotoxins